AZP may refer to:

 57 mm AZP S-60, an anti-aircraft gun
 Antonio Zanussi Pordenone, a wood-burning oven
 AZP Group, an American power company